"In the Bleak Midwinter" is a poem by the English poet Christina Rossetti, commonly performed as a Christmas carol. The poem was published, under the title "A Christmas Carol", in the January 1872 issue of Scribner's Monthly, and was first collected in book form in Goblin Market, The Prince's Progress and Other Poems (Macmillan, 1875).

In 1906, the composer Gustav Holst composed a setting of Rossetti's words (titled "Cranham") in The English Hymnal which is sung throughout the world. An anthem setting by Harold Darke composed in 1909 is also widely performed by choirs, and was named the best Christmas carol in a poll of some of the world's leading choirmasters and choral experts in 2008.

Analysis

In verse one, Rossetti describes the physical circumstances of the Incarnation in Bethlehem. In verse two, Rossetti contrasts Christ's first and second coming.  

The third verse dwells on Christ's birth and describes the simple surroundings, in a humble stable and watched by beasts of burden. 

Rossetti achieves another contrast in the fourth verse, this time between the incorporeal angels attendant at Christ's birth with Mary's ability to render Jesus physical affection. The final verse shifts the description to a more introspective thought process.

Hymnologist and theologian Ian Bradley has questioned the poem's theology: "Is it right to say that heaven cannot hold God, nor the earth sustain, and what about heaven and earth fleeing away when he comes to reign?"

Settings
The text of this Christmas poem has been set to music many times. Two of the most famous settings were composed by Gustav Holst and Harold Darke in the early 20th century.

Holst

Holst's setting, Cranham, is a hymn tune setting suitable for congregational singing, since the poem is irregular in metre and any setting of it requires a skilful and adaptable tune. The hymn is titled after Cranham, Gloucestershire and was written for the English Hymnal of 1906.

Darke

The Darke setting, was written in 1909 while he was a student at the Royal College of Music.  Although melodically similar, it is more advanced; each verse is treated slightly differently, with solos for soprano and tenor (or a group of sopranos and tenors) and a delicate organ accompaniment. This version is favoured by cathedral choirs and is the one usually heard performed on the radio broadcasts of Nine Lessons and Carols by the King's College Choir. Darke served as conductor of the choir during World War II.  Darke omits verse four of Rossetti's original, and bowdlerizes Rossetti's "a breastful of milk" to "a heart full of mirth", although later editions reversed this change. Darke also repeats the last line of the final verse. Darke would complain, however, that the popularity of this tune prevented people from performing his other compositions, and rarely performed it outside of Christmas services.

In 2016, the Darke setting was used in a multitrack rearrangement of the song by music producer Jacob Collier. It features contemporary compositional techniques such as microtonality.

Other settings
Benjamin Britten includes an elaborate five-part setting of the first verse for high voices (combined with the medieval Corpus Christi Carol)  in his work A Boy was Born.

Other settings include those by Robert C L Watson, Bruce Montgomery, Bob Chilcott, Michael John Trotta, Robert Walker, Eric Thiman, who wrote a setting for solo voice and piano, and Leonard Lehrman.

In popular culture

 It is quoted throughout the Peaky Blinders TV series.
 It makes an appearance in the series premiere of The Crown, "Wolferton Splash", in which King George VI (played by Jared Harris) joins a band of carolers at Sandringham House in singing the final verse.
 Most of the main characters sing the first verse in the Christmas episode of the BBC TV series Ghosts.
 The character Patrick Lewis recalls the first verse in the novel In the Skin of a Lion by Michael Ondaatje.
 It is sung by the character Abigail Pettigrew, played by Welsh singer Katherine Jenkins in the Doctor Who episode "A Christmas Carol".

See also
 List of Christmas carols

References

External links

  (free).
 .

Christmas carols
Poetry by Christina Rossetti
Epiphany music
1872 poems
Songs based on poems